Ashburton was an electoral district of the Legislative Assembly in the Australian state of Western Australia from 1890 to 1901 and again from 1989 to 1996.

The district was one of the original 30 seats contested at the 1890 election. It was located in the remote north-west of the state. In 1898, the district's main settlement was the town of Onslow; it also included various pastoral leases along the Fortescue River. The seat was abolished ahead of the 1901 election.

Revived for the 1989 election, Ashburton was won by Labor candidate Pam Buchanan, previously the member for Pilbara. Buchanan, by this time an independent, resigned the seat in 1991 due to ill-health, triggering a by-election won by Labor candidate Fred Riebeling. The district was abolished ahead of the 1996 election and Riebeling shifted to the new seat of Burrup at that election.

Members for Ashburton

Election results

References

Ashburton
1890 establishments in Australia
Constituencies established in 1890
1901 disestablishments in Australia
Constituencies disestablished in 1901
Constituencies disestablished in 1996
Constituencies established in 1989
1989 establishments in Australia
1996 disestablishments in Australia